The Witch Elm (also published as The Wych Elm) is a 2018 novel by Tana French. The novel is a standalone, not related to her Dublin Murder Squad novels.

Writing and development
French was motivated to write the novel as an exploration of the connection between luck and an individual's ability to feel empathy for others.  French was also inspired by Bella in the Wych Elm, an unidentified woman found in a wych elm in Hagley in the 1940s. French does not find true crime any more recent than the Bella case interesting, partially due to the ongoing impacts on living people caused by more recent crimes. To accurately depict the protagonist's experience after a traumatic event, French conducted research about PTSD.

French was also motivated to write the novel due to an interest in exploring a crime from a perspective other than that of a detective, the primary viewpoint used in her Dublin Murder Squad novels.

Reception
The novel received mostly positive reviews from critics. American author Stephen King, in a review written for The New York Times, praised the novel as "extraordinary".

References

2018 American novels
English-language novels
Crime novels
Works by Tana French
Viking Press books